Lomelin is a surname. Notable people with the surname include:

Carlos Salazar Lomelín (born 1951), Mexican businessman
Pedro de Barrientos Lomelin (died 1658), Roman Catholic bishop